Singelloop (Dutch for Canal Run) is the name which may refer to a number of road running competitions in the Netherlands:

Bredase Singelloop, a half marathon race in Breda first held in 1986
Goudse Nationale Singelloop, a 10 km race in Gouda
Leidse Singelloop, a 6.6-kilometre race first held in Leiden in 1976
Singelloop Utrecht, a 10 km event in Utrecht first held in 1925